Energy Exploration Technologies, Inc. (more commonly known as EnergyX) is an American technology company. Founded in 2018 by Teague Egan, it is based out of San Juan, Puerto Rico and has offices and laboratory facilities in Austin, Texas, and operations in the South American Lithium Triangle (Bolivia, Chile and Argentina).
 
The company specializes in development, manufacturing and deployment of lithium mining technology, in particular LiTAS direct lithium extraction (DLE) technology and SoLiS solid state lithium metal batteries.
 
In 2021, EnergyX deployed its first LiTAS plant for operation at Bolivia’s Salar de Uyuni location.

Overview
EnergyX was established in 2018 by serial technology entrepreneur Teague Egan, son of Michael Egan, who had been among the founders of the Alamo Rent a Car company.
 
From the beginning, the startup company has been focused on lithium extraction and recovery technology. It started out as a R&D project based on the technology developed by the Research Center for Materials for Water and Energy Systems (M-WET) at the University of Texas in Austin and directed by the chemical engineer and professor Benny D. Freeman. In 2019, EnergyX acquired and licensed lithium extraction technology (LiTAS) from the University of Texas and further developed the procedural knowledge of direct lithium extraction (DLE) in its scientific center located in Austin, Texas.
 
In 2021, EnergyX secured $20 million in direct funding that came from Obsidian Acquisition Partners, Helios Capital and a variety of other angels and institutions. The company raised nearly $5 million through crowdfunding.
 
EnergyX was in the group of eight companies from the United States, Argentina, China and Russia shortlisted by the Bolivian President Luis Arce's government for deployment of direct lithium extraction (DLE) technology at two lithium mining sites of Bolivia - Coipasa in Pastos Grandes and Uyuni salt flats. In December 2021, EnergyX deployed its first plant at Bolivia’s Salar de Uyuni. The New York Times called EnergyX an “American Underdog” and noted that " EnergyX was one of two from the United States among the eight contenders to develop Bolivia’s lithium reserves.

Technology
The company develops direct lithium extraction (DLE) technology based on proprietary LiTAS method. The method includes filtering of the brine that contains lithium through a series of selective membranes, separating various types of salts, such as magnesium, sodium, potassium, sulfate and other chemicals from lithium.
 
According to The Chemical Engineer: "In the last years, the company moved from the metal-organic framework system (MOF) originally developed at the University of Texas to non-MOF membranes technology developed by the company's scientific labs. The first step in EnergyX’s process uses its Lithium-Ion Transport and Separation (LiTAS) electrodialysis technology. LiTAS uses a proprietary ion-exchange membrane to separate out the dissolved lithium ions from the brine solution, which results in lithium being separated from undesired species such as magnesium in the solution. The second step then involves bipolar electrodialysis which splits a salt into its acid and base components. In the case of lithium chloride, it splits into lithium hydroxide and hydrochloric acid."
 
The lithium separation technology is assembled into  processing units, which, in turn, are integrated in large housing containers. The containers are modular, scalable, and transportable and can be used as complementary extracting technology to the traditional mining infrastructure.

Operations and offices
EnergyX is headquartered in San Juan, Puerto Rico and has R&D laboratories and pilot facilities in Austin, Texas. In addition, the company has operations in the Lithium Triangle area of Bolivia, Chile and Argentina. In 2021, the company deployed its first plant at Bolivia’s Salar de Uyuni. In 2021, the company announced that it was looking to hire over a hundred employees for the launch of a new Energy Innovation Lab in an American tech hub. Possible candidate sites included Boston, Miami, Austin, and Silicon Valley.

See also
Lithium production
 Rare-earth metals
 Lithium

References

External links
 

Mining companies of the United States
Lithium mining